is a Japanese female volleyball player. She was part of the Japan women's national volleyball team.

She participated in the 2005 FIVB Volleyball World Grand Prix.
On club level she played for Hitachi Sawa Rivale in 2005.

References

External links
 Profile at FIVB.org

1979 births
Living people
Japanese women's volleyball players
Place of birth missing (living people)